Cynthia García Coll is an American developmental psychologist, and the former editor-in-chief of Child Development. She teaches at Carlos Albizu University in Puerto Rico, where she is the Associate Director of the Institutional Center for Scientific Research. She has authored more than a hundred publications, including several books.

Career
García Coll is the current editor-in-chief of Child Development, a journal in the fields of psychology and child development. She received her PhD from Harvard, and as of 2017, was the Associate Director of the Institutional Center for Scientific Research at Carlos Albizu University, located in San Juan, Puerto Rico. She is also a Professor in the Clinical Psychology program at Albizu. Prior to moving back to Puerto Rico, where she grew up, García Coll was a professor of education, psychology, and pediatrics at Brown University.

García Coll was a member of the MacArthur Foundation Network "Successful Pathways Through Middle Childhood" from 1994–2002. In 2009, she received the Cultural and Contextual Contributions to Child Development Award from the Society for Research in Child Development. She is a fellow of the American Psychological Association, and served as past president of the Society for the Study of Human Development.

García Coll has researched a number of topics, including the resilience of children born to teen mothers and of immigrant children. She has also explored the immigrant paradox, which shows that first-generation immigrant children and adolescents tend to be better adjusted academically and behaviorally than later assimilated generations. García Coll has found that immigrant Hispanic children living in homes where Spanish is spoken are better adjusted than similar immigrant children living in homes where Spanish is not spoken. Her work has also shown that access to social welfare and policies aimed at the inclusion of immigrants have a positive effect on immigrant children's academic success. The graduation rate of children with at least one immigrant parent was 5.3% higher in US states where immigrant families could receive benefits through the Temporary Assistance for Needy Families program, which provides Federal subsidies to low-income families.

Personal life
García Coll resides in Puerto Rico, outside of the capital San Juan.

Selected works
García Coll has authored more than a hundred publications, including a number of books.

Articles

Books

See also

 Index of Puerto Rico-related articles
 List of developmental psychologists
 List of psychologists

References

External links
Cynthia García Coll (in Spanish), staff directory for Carlos Albizu University

Living people
Academic journal editors
Puerto Rican academics
Fellows of the American Psychological Association
American women psychologists
Harvard University alumni
Brown University faculty
Year of birth missing (living people)
American women academics
American child psychologists